Smardzów may refer to the following places in Lower Silesian Voivodeship, Poland:
Smardzów, Głogów County
Smardzów, Oleśnica County
Smardzów, Wrocław County